Metrolink, MetroLink, or Metro-link is the name of several transport services throughout the world:

Australia 
Metro-link Bus Lines, a bus operator in Sydney, New South Wales
TransdevTSL, formerly known as MetroLink, former joint venture between Transdev  and Transfield Services
Transdev Brisbane Ferries, formerly known as Metrolink Queensland, a ferry operator in Brisbane, Queensland
MetroLink Victoria, former operator of Yarra Trams in Melbourne, Victoria
Sydney Metro (2008 proposal), also known as Metro Link

Canada 
MetroLink (Halifax), a bus rapid transit service in the Halifax Regional Municipality, Nova Scotia

India 
Metro-Link Express for Gandhinagar and Ahmedabad, a rapid transit system for the cities of Ahmedabad and Gandhinagar

Ireland 
MetroLink (Dublin), a proposed metro line in Dublin city.

New Zealand 
Metrolink, a division of NZ Bus that operated bus services in Auckland

United Kingdom 
Manchester Metrolink, a light rail network in Greater Manchester, England

United States 
Metrolink (California), a commuter rail system in Southern California
MetroLink (St. Louis), an electric light rail service in the Saint Louis, Missouri/Illinois metropolitan area
Quad Cities MetroLINK, a bus service in the Quad Cities region of Illinois and Iowa
Plymouth Metrolink, a public transit system that serves Plymouth, Minnesota

See also
 Metrolinx, a public transport governing body in Southern Ontario, Canada
 Metlink, a public transport governing body in Melbourne, Australia
 Metrolink crash (disambiguation)